TuneIn is a global audio streaming service delivering live news, radio, sports, music, and podcasts to over 75 million monthly active users.

TuneIn is operated by the company TuneIn Inc. which is based in San Francisco, California. The company was founded by Bill Moore in 2002 as RadioTime in Dallas, Texas. Users can listen to radio on the TuneIn website, use a mobile app, smart speaker, or another supported device. , TuneIn was also available on more than 55 vehicle models. In 2013, the company raised more than $47 million in venture funding from Institutional Venture Partners, Sequoia Capital, GV, General Catalyst Partners, and Icon Ventures. 

In November 2020, TuneIn appointed Richard Stern as Chief Executive Officer and Rob Deichert as Chief Revenue Officer, with a new investment led by Innovation Endeavors.

Function
As of 2019, the TuneIn website and apps allow users to listen to more than 100,000 radio stations from around the world including AM, FM, HD, LP, digital and internet stations, along with podcasts. TuneIn's directory lists various sports, news, talk, and music broadcasts from around the world. TuneIn's website is available in 22 languages, each with its own content tailored for the specific language or region. TuneIn also offers 5.7 million on-demand programs.

In March 2018, TuneIn launched another premium live audio subscription called "TuneIn Live," which offers play-by-play calls from thousands of live sporting events, plus access to premium news stations, talks shows and other content. The company launched the subscription-based radio service exclusively for Alexa-enabled speakers and subscribers can prompt Alexa to stream news programs as well as play-by-play broadcasts of MLB, NFL, NBA, and NHL games. TuneIn Live marked the first time TuneIn premium content was available over a voice platform. In October 2018, the company launched a commercial-free news offering through TuneIn Premium, which included new programs from such as CNBC, Fox News Talk, and MSNBC, as well as news podcasts from Progressive Voices, The Economist, and The Wall Street Journal.

In 2017, the company raised $50 million and was valued at $500 million.

In August 2015, TuneIn launched a premium service, "TuneIn Premium", that includes audiobooks, sports content from MLB, NHL, NFL, NBA, news content from MSNBC, Al Jazeera, and more. Subscribers had been able to record anything played through the TuneIn service, the feature was first discontinued in the UK in early 2017, and the rest of the world on September 14, 2020, citing legal issues. However, that feature remains on older versions of the TuneIn Pro app.

Content 
The platform has deals with various broadcasters of sports, news, talk, and music worldwide like ESPN Radio, NPR, Public Radio Exchange (PRX), CBC / Radio-Canada, C-SPAN Radio, All India Radio, Emmis Communications, Hearst Radio, iHeartMedia, Urban One, mvyradio, Wu-Tang Radio (Wu World Radio), ABC Radio and Regional Content (Australia), Bonneville International, Sport Your Argument, talkSPORT, and Westwood One Podcast Network.

On June 25, 2018, Audacy, Inc. (then known as Entercom) announced that it would move online streaming of its stations from TuneIn to its then-named in-house Radio.com platform, with legacy stations removed July 6, and former CBS Radio stations removed on August 1. In turn, Cumulus Media joined the TuneIn platform on August 9, 2018.

On July 26, 2021, iHeartMedia owned-radio stations were added into TuneIn after the two sides agreed on a deal. The deal would also allow TuneIn to gain advertising from IHeartMedia's local sales.

In January 2022, TuneIn launched TuneIn On Air, a new service for non-profit broadcasters, podcasters and long-tail content creators to access the company's apps and connected devices for digital distribution of their content.

Music
In May 2018, the company announced it would exclusively stream concerts from several summer music festivals including Outside Lands Music and Arts Festival in San Francisco, the Newport Jazz Festival in Newport, RI, the Hangout Fest in Gulf Shores, Alabama, the Firefly Music Festival in Dover, Delaware and the Newport Folk Festival.

Two months later Cathleen Robertson, better known as DJ Carisma of KRRL, joined TuneIn to head Hip-Hop/R&B curation and artist relations initiatives. During the winter of 2018, the company announced that John Legend and several other top musicians would take over its "Holiday Hits" station during the season.

Sports
In August 2015, TuneIn announced deals with MLB and Premier League and the Bundesliga for live play-by-play coverage. This also includes the ability to cover the minor league affiliates. In October 2015, NFL announced a deal with TuneIn to broadcast live, play-by-play coverage of all NFL games to its premium subscribers.

On December 22, 2015, the National Hockey League (NHL) announced that TuneIn would gain radio rights to the NHL. TuneIn would create an individual station for every NHL team to simulcast their home market broadcasts on. Additionally, TuneIn would create a replay channel for each team so fans could listen to the games archived. They would also create a 24/7 NHL Channel, and the NHL would embed TuneIn's player onto the NHL.com website. All TuneIn NHL items would be made available to the public for free. The first broadcasts for TuneIn began January 1, 2016. On September 22, 2022, the Anaheim Ducks announced that TuneIn would become the home for all of their game broadcasts, and launched a 24/7 station called Ducks Stream to broadcast team-related content.

On February 15, 2019, the Oakland Athletics of Major League Baseball announced that TuneIn would be launching a 24/7 exclusive A's station which would include free streaming of all the team's games within the team's market as well as exclusive team programming. In 2020, it was planned for TuneIn to become the exclusive home of the A's in the Bay Area after the team abandoned radio in the market however the team later stuck a deal with iHeartMedia to have KNEW serve as the team's flagship station and A's Cast moved to the iHeartRadio app.

In August 2020, TuneIn removed MLB and NBA content from its platform with no explanation given. The next month, TuneIn also removed NFL content from its platform without explanation.

As of August 2021, NFL content returned on TuneIn's platform. 

In March 2022, TuneIn signed a multi-year agreement with Major League Baseball to be an official audio partner of MLB, giving Premium users access to live and on-demand play by play of all games, post-game analysis, and Spanish language broadcasts.

On August 5, 2022, TuneIn announced they would carry all English Premier League matches.

Audiobooks
In August 2015, the service launched deals with book publishers including Penguin Random House and HarperCollins to provide an audiobook library. In December 2017, TuneIn announced that it would remove audiobooks as of January 15, 2018.

Partnerships
In October 2018, TuneIn partnered with MSNBC to exclusively represent the sales rights of podcast, Bag Man: A Rachel Maddow Original Podcast. TuneIn also partnered with Adobe Advertising Cloud in June 2018 to integrate targeted audio ads to consumers via smart speakers.

In January 2019, TuneIn announced a partnership with professional golfer Greg Norman to integrate its audio streaming platform into his line of connected golf carts called 'Norman's Shark Experience.'

In November 2021, TuneIn partnered with News Corp-Owned News UK to bring UK-based news, music and sports coverage to the streaming platform.

In April 2022, TuneIn partnered with Amazon to bring its TuneIn Premium subscription service to all Amazon Alexa-enabled devices.

Legal issues 
In 2017, TuneIn was sued by Sony Music UK and Warner Music UK, alleging copyright infringement by offering access to international radio stations not licensed for distribution in the United Kingdom. The companies also took issue with a feature in its premium tier (which was later disabled in the country) that allowed users to record broadcasts. In November 2019, the English High Court ruled that despite its arguments that it was merely an aggregator similar to a search engine, the TuneIn service infringed the labels' rights by making streams not licensed in the country available to its users (an infringement of the exclusive right to communicate a work to the public, under EU copyright law). The court granted a request for an appeal.

In September 2020, TuneIn began to geoblock all international radio stations for users in the United Kingdom, citing the earlier court order.

On March 29, 2021, the Court of Appeal upheld the High Court decision, ruling that TuneIn infringed the right of communication to the public.

In May 2022, TuneIn removed United Kingdom stations that were not registered with the music licensing bodies PRS and PPL.

References

External links

Internet radio stations in the United States
Android (operating system) software
BlackBerry software
IOS software
Windows Phone software
Multilingual websites
2002 establishments in California
Universal Windows Platform apps
Android Auto software
Music streaming services
Podcasting software